Sev mamra (mumra) is an Indian snack. It is a mixture of spicy dry ingredients such as puffed rice (mamra), savoury fried noodles (sev) and peanuts.

Regional variation of the snack varies by adding capsicum, onions, or pickled mangos.

It is available in most parts of India, though it is known by different names in different regions.

See also
 Bombay mix
 Bhelpuri
 Ghugni

Indian snack foods
Gujarati cuisine